Our Will Be Done is an album by The Crucifucks, released in 1992 on Jello Biafra's Alternative Tentacles record label. The album is a compilation combining all songs from their two previous albums, The Crucifucks and Wisconsin. The album received criticism for its controversial image on the back cover of what appeared to be a dead Philadelphia police man.

Track listing
 "Democracy Spawns Bad Taste" – 1:52
 "Go Bankrupt and Die" – 1:23
 "You Give Me the Creeps" – 1:03
 "Marching for Trash" – 1:45
 "Legal Genocide" – 2:29
 "I Am the Establishment" – 1:54
 "Cops for Fertilizer" – 1:48
 "Hinkley Had a Vision" – 2:12
 "By the Door" – 2:43
 "Oh Where, Oh Where?" – 1:10
 "I Was" – 1:25
 "Similar Items" – 2:32
 "Official Terrorism" – 1:27
 "No One Can Make Me Play Along with This" – 3:25
 "Down on My Knees" – 3:08
 "Annual Report - 1:22
 "Intro"- 1:44
 "The Mountain Song" - 1:24
 "Washington" - 2:09
 "Resurrection" - 2:04
 "Earth by Invitation Only" - 1:06
 "Laws Against Laughing" - 1:56
 "Pig in a Blanket" - 4:30
 "When the Top Comes Off" - 5:01
 "Concession Stand" - 4:21
 "Wisconsin" - 2:26
 "Artificial Competition" - 3:19
 "Holiday Parade" - 1:39
 "The Savior" - 6:32

References

The Crucifucks albums
1992 compilation albums
Alternative Tentacles compilation albums